Constant Permeke (31 July 1886 – 4 January 1952) was a Belgian painter and sculptor who is considered the leading figure of Flemish expressionism.

Biography
Permeke was born in Antwerp but when he was six years old the family moved to Ostend. Here his father, a landscape painter, founded in 1893 the Municipal Museum of Arts of which he became the curator. Permeke studied at the Bruges Academy from 1903 to 1906 and then at the Academy in Ghent from 1906 to 1908. Here he met Frits Van den Berghe and the brothers Gustave De Smet and Léon De Smet. He was drafted into the Belgian army and served in a university company that was quartered in Sint-Martens-Latem. After his military service ended in March 1908, Permeke returned to Ostend where he roomed together with Gustave De Smet. In 1909 he returned to Sint-Martens-Latem where he lived as a recluse. His work of this period is characterized by his heavy brush and gains its expressive force through muted tonality and brutal forms. In 1912 Permeke married Maria Delaere and the newlyweds settled in Ostend.

When World War I broke out, Permeke was mobilized. During the defense of Antwerp he was wounded in action near the town of Duffel. His wounds forced his evacuation to the United Kingdom where he was in hospital at South Hillwood. After his release from hospital he was reunited with his family in Folkestone, where his son John was born. In 1916 he moved to Chardstock in Devonshire and started painting again, mostly colorful English landscapes. After the end of the war, the Permeke family returned to Ostend in 1919. In contrast to the happy time in Devonshire, the harsh reality of the worker's life turned Permeke's work back to a gloomier mood as he mainly painted the harsh fisherman's life.

In 1921 Permeke was able to exhibit his work in Antwerp and in Paris. Between 1922 and 1924, Permeke regularly went to Astene, in order to cooperate with Frits Van den Berghe. In 1926 Permeke went to Vevey in Switzerland where he mainly painted mountain scenes. In 1929 he moved to Jabbeke. During this period he changed his subject: instead of the fisherman and the sea he now focused on the farmer and his land. During this period, Permeke was enormously productive with works like "Gouden Oogst" (1935), "De Grote Marine" (1935), "Moederschap" (1936), "Het Afscheid" (1948), "Dagelijks Brood" (1950). Starting in 1937 Permeke tried his hand at sculpting as well. As a sculptor, Permeke tried to isolate the human figure in monumental efforts. "De Zaaier" (1939), "Niobe" (1946) and "De Drie Gratiën" (1949) are good examples of this period.

During World War II, Permeke was forbidden to paint by the German occupiers as his art was seen by them as Entartete Kunst. Privately, things were even worse as his son Paul was arrested and sent to Germany as a forced labourer. After the war, Permeke was appointed director of the National higher Institute and of the Royal Academy in Antwerp but after only one year he offered his resignation. In 1947–48, Permeke had a big retrospective exhibition in Paris but his happiness at the return of his son was soon shattered when in 1948 his wife died. Emotionally scarred and ailing, Permeke had to be nursed by his daughter.

During the last period of his life his work mellowed somewhat as it shows much more refinement in drawing and colors. His last works are "De dame met de rode handschoenen" (1951) and some landscapes painted in Brittany. After his trip to there in 1951, his health declined even further and he became bedridden.

Constant Permeke died on 4 January 1952. Four days later he was buried next to his wife at the cemetery in Jabbeke. On the grave of his beloved wife was placed a statue which Permeke had commissioned from his friend George Minne.

Honours 
 1922: Officer in the Order of Leopold.

Commemoration 
In 1997, Belgium recognized Permeke's achievements by having his portrait and one of his works imprinted on the 1,000 Belgian franc bill.

References

1886 births
1952 deaths
Belgian Expressionist painters
Academic staff of the Royal Academy of Fine Arts (Antwerp)
Belgian military personnel of World War I
20th-century Belgian sculptors
20th-century Belgian painters
Military personnel from Antwerp